Benbreen at , is the 100th–highest peak in Ireland on the Arderin scale, and the 122nd–highest peak on the Vandeleur-Lynam scale.  Benbreen lies in the southern end of the Twelve Bens mountain range in the Connemara National Park in Galway, Ireland.  Benbreen is the 4th-tallest mountain of the Twelve Bens range, after Benbaun , Bencorr , and  Bencollaghduff  .  Benbreen's profile is of a "high narrow rocky ridge with several summits", than a typical "peaked mountain".

Naming

Geography
The actual summit of Benbreen lies on the southern end of a long high rocky quartzite ridge that includes the subsidiary peaks of Benbreen Central Top , and Benbreen North Top ; this gives Benbreen the profile of a "high narrow ridge", with Benbreen as the South Top, than a typical "peaked mountain".

Benbreen's prominence of  qualifies it as a Marilyn, and it also ranks it as the 60th-highest mountain in Ireland on the MountainViews Online Database, 100 Highest Irish Mountains, where the minimum prominence threshold is 100 metres.

Recreation

Hill walking

Benbreen is most often climbed as part of the popular 16–kilometre 8–9 hour Glencoaghan Horseshoe, considered one of Ireland's best high-grade hill-walking routes.  Benbreen is also climbed as part of the even longer Owenglin Horseshoe, a 20–kilometre 10–12 hour route around the Owenglin River taking in over twelve summits;

Rock climbing

Benbreen's northeastern cliffs have multi-pitch rock-climbs with grades from Diff (D) to Moderate Severe (MS), and length ranging from 40 to 130 metres. Some of the first ascents date from the mid 1980s, and noted routes include Blind Faith (S 3a, 4a, 3a, 80 m), and Stoned & Starving (S -, 4a, 75 m).

Gallery

Bibliography

See also

Twelve Bens
Mweelrea, major range in Killary Harbour
Maumturks, major range in Connemara
Lists of mountains in Ireland
Lists of mountains and hills in the British Isles
List of Marilyns in the British Isles
List of Hewitt mountains in England, Wales and Ireland

References

External links
MountainViews: The Irish Mountain Website, Benbreen
MountainViews: Irish Online Mountain Database
The Database of British and Irish Hills , the largest database of British Isles mountains ("DoBIH")
Hill Bagging UK & Ireland, the searchable interface for the DoBIH

Marilyns of Ireland
Hewitts of Ireland
Mountains and hills of County Galway
Geography of County Galway
Mountains under 1000 metres